Not So Dusty is a 1936 British comedy film directed by Maclean Rogers and starring Wally Patch, Gus McNaughton and Muriel George. The screenplay concerns two London rubbish collectors who come into possession of a valuable book, and thwart the attempts of some criminals to con them out of it.

The film was made at Nettlefold Studios in Walton-on-Thames. It was remade in 1956 starring Leslie Dwyer and Bill Owen.

Cast
 Wally Patch as Dusty Gray
 Gus McNaughton as Nobby Clark
 Muriel George as Mrs. Clark
 Philip Ray as Dan Stevens
 John Singer as Johnny Clark
 Isobel Scaife as Mary
 Ethel Griffies as Miss Miller
 H. F. Maltby as Mr. Armstrong
 Raymond Lovell as Mr. Holding

Critical reception
Monthly Film Bulletin wrote, "good light entertainment of an unsuphisticated type...in the (comic) music hall tradition...(with) the Cockney atmosphere...well and consistently carried out."

Bibliography
 Shafer, Stephen. British Popular Films: 1929-1939. Routledge, 1997.

External links

References

1936 films
1936 comedy films
British comedy films
Films directed by Maclean Rogers
Films set in London
British black-and-white films
1930s English-language films
1930s British films